The Sri Raya MRT station (Working name: Taman Cuepacs) is a Mass Rapid Transit (MRT) station serving the suburb of Batu 10 Cheras, Selangor, Malaysia. It serves as one of the stations on Klang Valley Mass Rapid Transit (KVMRT) Kajang Line. The station is located at 703 Telekom interchange of the  Cheras–Kajang Expressway.

Background
The name Sri Raya comes from the village of Kampung Sri Raya. Sri Raya is a residential area located on the south of Cheras and property near Sri Raya MRT station would include Taman Megah Cheras, Taman Cheras Permai, Taman Kota Cheras and Taman Sri Aman amongst others.

Nestled among the matured neighborhood makes the area of Taman Sri Raya very convenient as amenities are abundant and easily accessible within short driving distances.

There are also plenty of education facilities in the vicinity and shop lots. For bigger malls, those living in property near Sri Raya MRT can opt for Econsave, Aeon Cheras Selatan, Aeon Big BTHO, Tesco Kajang or The Mines Shopping Mall which are approximately 15 minutes drive away.

With the introduction of the Sri Raya MRT, property near Sri Raya MRT will enjoy high appreciation value and will be high in demand as the MRT provides accessibility to those who live in the area. The MRT provides access to over 30 stations along the Sungai Buloh Kajang MRT line and connects a small neighborhood like Sri Raya to areas like the KL city centre, Pusat Bandar Damansara and even to Sungai Buloh.  For those who are working in KL city centre will find living along the MRT line a very convenient feature, thus you would want to consider looking at the list of property near Sri Raya MRT.

Property near Sri Raya MRT station

Langat Jaya Condo
Pangsapuri Vistana Mahkota
Bandar Mahkota Cheras Apartment
Pangsapuri Angsana
Pangsapuri Teratai
Suria Court
Flat Taman Damai Jaya
Flat Taman Seri Cheras
D’ Puncak Suasana
D’ Tinggian Suasana
Taman Megah Cheras Apartment
Flat Taman Kota Cheras
Saville Cheras (New)
Metro Cheras (New)

Station Background

Station Layout
The station has a layout and design similar to that of most other elevated stations on the line (except the terminus and underground stations), with the platform level on the topmost floor, consisting of two sheltered side platforms along a double tracked line and a single concourse housing ticketing facilities between the ground level and the platform level. All levels are linked by lifts, stairways and escalators.

Exits and entrances
The station has three entrances. Entrance C provides a direct pedestrian link to Taman Kota Cheras above the  Cheras–Kajang Expressway. The feeder buses operate from the station's feeder bus hub via Entrance A within the station area.

Bus Services

Feeder bus services
With the opening of the MRT Kajang Line, feeder buses also began operating linking the station with several housing areas and villages around the Bandar Tun Hussein Onn and Batu 10 Cheras area. The feeder buses operate from the station's feeder bus hub accessed via Entrance A of the station.

Other Bus Services 
The MRT Sri Raya station also provides accessibility for some other bus services.

See also
 Prasarana Malaysia Berhad
 Land Public Transport Commission (SPAD)
 Public transport in Kuala Lumpur
 Buses in Kuala Lumpur
 Klang Valley Integrated Transit System
 List of rail transit stations in Klang Valley

References

External links
 Sri Raya MRT Station | mrt.com.my
 Klang Valley Mass Rapid Transit
 Mass Rapid Transit Corporation Sdn Bhd (MRT Corp)
 Prasarana Malaysia Berhad
 RapidKL Prasarana Malaysia Berhad
 bigkl

Rapid transit stations in Selangor
Sungai Buloh-Kajang Line
Railway stations opened in 2017